The Baskin High School Building is a historic school building located along Louisiana Highway 857 in Baskin, Louisiana.

Built in 1925–26, it is a two-story brick building with 11 bays along its front facade.  It has a two-story auditorium extending to the rear.

It was deemed "significant in the area of architecture as Baskin's most pretentious and monumental structure."  Since its construction it has been a community focal point.

The building was listed on the National Register of Historic Places on October 7, 1981.

See also
National Register of Historic Places listings in Franklin Parish, Louisiana

References

School buildings on the National Register of Historic Places in Louisiana
School buildings completed in 1925
Franklin Parish, Louisiana
High schools in Louisiana
1925 establishments in Louisiana